John Guthrie Griffith-Jones   (born 11 May 1954) is a British accountant. He was chairman of the Financial Conduct Authority.

Early life
John Griffith-Jones was born on 11 May 1954. He is the son of Mervyn Griffith-Jones and Joan Baker. He was educated at Eton College, and he earned a bachelor of arts degree from Trinity Hall, Cambridge in 1975.

Career
Griffith-Jones worked for KPMG from 1975 to 2012. He was the chairman of its Europe, Middle East, Africa and India division from 2008 to 2012.

Griffith-Jones was a director and deputy chairman of the Financial Services Authority from 2012 to 2013. Between April 2013 and April 2018 he served as the chairman of the Financial Conduct Authority.

Griffith-Jones served on the advisory board of the Cambridge Judge Business School from 2008 to 2016.

Griffith-Jones has been the Chair of StepChange Debt Charity since January 2019.

He was appointed a Deputy Lieutenant of Essex in 2019.

Personal life
Griffith-Jones married Cathryn Mary Stone in 1990. They have a son and a daughter.

References 

Living people
British chairpersons of corporations
People educated at Eton College
Alumni of Trinity Hall, Cambridge
British accountants
Deputy Lieutenants of Essex
Financial Conduct Authority people
1954 births